South Park National Heritage Area is a U.S. National Heritage Area encompassing the South Park of Colorado. Established on March 30, 2009 by the Omnibus Public Land Management Act of 2009 (§7002), the South Park NHA is managed by the Park County, Colorado Office of Tourism to promote and interpret the area's natural, scenic, and cultural resources. The National Heritage Area designation funds promotion of the area's mining, recreation, and ranching heritage.

The National Heritage Area covers the majority of Park County, including the communities of Lake George, Hartsel, Fairplay, Como, Tarryall, Jefferson and Alma, all roughly within South Park or the surrounding mountains.  The area includes portions of the Mosquito Range, the Buffalo Peaks Wilderness, the Lost Creek Wilderness, and the Lost Creek National Natural Landmark.

References

External links
 South Park National Heritage Area Website
 South Park National Heritage Area at Park County, Colorado

National Heritage Areas of the United States
History of the Rocky Mountains
Protected areas of Park County, Colorado
Protected areas established in 2009
2009 establishments in Colorado